Brighton Corporation Tramways operated an electric tramway service in Brighton between 1901 and 1939.

History
Brighton Corporation Tramways operated an extensive network of routes in the first four decades of the 20th century. The first route to operate, from 25 November 1901, ran from the main terminus at the Aquarium (outside Brighton Pier) to Lewes Road, a major route to the north-east; other routes were quickly established, so that by 1904 its full extent had been established. The routes were as follows:

Routes B and D formed a loop that took approximately 30 minutes to navigate. Route B ran clockwise (via Beaconsfield Road first, then returning via Ditchling Road). A depot serving the whole network was established on Lewes Road, a short distance before the terminus; Brighton & Hove now uses the building as its central Brighton depot.

Closure

Improvements in motor bus and trolleybus technology meant that by the 1930s, the tram system found it difficult to compete, and most of the network was replaced by the Brighton trolleybus system or motor bus routes in 1939. The last tram arrived at Lewes Road depot in the early hours of 1 September 1939 – at about the same time Germany invaded Poland, and ignited the conflict that became World War II.

Distinctive timber shelters were built at many stops in the early years of the network. Some of these are still standing today at Ditchling Road (Florence Place), Queen's Park Road (Pepperpot), and Dyke Road (reservoir). Another found reuse as the Aquarium Station of the Volk's Electric Railway. One is preserved at the Stanmer Rural Museum, and two at the Chalkpits Museum at Amberley.

The windows are still etched with 'Brighton Corporation Tramways'.

Preserved tramcar
Tramcar number 53 survives, and a society has been established for its restoration. The Society is now in possession of Works Car number 1, which will be restored next.

See also
Transport in Brighton and Hove

References

External links
 Brighton Corporation Tramways on the British Tramway Company Badges and Buttons website.

Tram transport in England
History of Brighton and Hove
3 ft 6 in gauge railways in England
Transport in Brighton and Hove
Brighton